Rah or yah is a pejorative term referring to a stereotypical affluent young upper class or upper-middle class person in the United Kingdom. The term "rah" originated as a contraction of "Hoorah Henry" (sometimes "Hoorah Henries and Henriettas"), a pejorative description of a social stereotype similar to the Sloane Ranger stereotype also recognised in the UK, though a rah is generally younger, typically around university age (18–25), and less associated geographically with London. The use of the term is likely to have been furthered by onomatopoeic correlation with the way in which those fitting the stereotype are perceived to talk, with the word 'rah' being associated with upper-middle class affluence since at least the early 1980s. An important feature of the rah stereotype is the enjoyment of an affluent/party lifestyle with excessive financial assistance from their parents.

At St Andrews and Edinburgh the term more frequently used is 'yah'. The use of the term 'yah', similarly, is likely to have been furthered by a perceived and much-parodied upper-class pronunciation of the word 'year' in the phrase 'gap year'.

Characteristics of the stereotype
Rahs stereotypically study at prestigious institutions such as Russell Group universities, having previously attended a private boarding or day school, or sometimes a grammar school or faith school in an affluent area. Another stereotype is that rahs have taken a gap year, usually in Africa, South America, or South East Asia.

Certain clothing is often associated with rahs; mid-market names such as Jack Wills are common. For girls, pashminas, jodhpurs, Ugg boots, flares and cable-knit jumpers combined with scruffy hair arranged in a bun or drastic side partings are common. Boys are stereotyped with chinos, board shorts, boat shoes, and sports team clothing. Gilets, quilted jackets, jogging bottoms, sunglasses, and flip-flops are common for both sexes. In colder seasons, country attire and outdoor wear is popular, especially brands such as Hunter Boot and J. Barbour & Sons.

Rugby union and cricket are popular for male rahs. Other sports such as skiing, sailing, rowing, tennis, Rugby and Eton fives, canoeing, fencing, lacrosse, polo, shooting, and yachting are also popular.

In popular culture
The Gap Yah sketch, by The Unexpected Items, features a typical rah.
Made in Chelsea
The Elvis Presley song "Poison Ivy League" performed in the 1964 movie Roustabout (film), contains the term rah-rah boys in several verses

See also
American prep
Soc subculture
Popular clique

References

2000s slang
2010s slang
Academic culture
Academic slang
Age-related stereotypes
British slang
Class-related slurs
Social class in the United Kingdom
Stereotypes of the middle class
Stereotypes of the upper class
Youth culture in the United Kingdom